The 2014–15 Tunisian Cup (Coupe de Tunisie) was the 83rd season of the football cup competition of Tunisia.
The competition is organized by the Fédération Tunisienne de Football (FTF) and open to all clubs in Tunisia.
Ligue 1 teams entered the competition in the Round of 32.

First round

Ligue 3 games
Only Ligue 3 teams compete in this round.

Ligue 2 games
Only Ligue 2 teams compete in this round.

*The game was canceled and the qualification to the next round was awarded to AS Oued Ellil.

Second round

*CS Nefta and US Ajim Jerba withdrew

Third round
The 16 winners of this round will advance to the Round of 32, in which the 16 teams of 2014–15 Ligue 1 will join the competition.

*OS Chenini withdrew.

Round of 32
In this round, Ligue 1 teams enter the competition.

*US Bousalem withdrew on 20 February.

Round of 16
The draw was held on 19 April 2015. 
The draw also determined the games of the quarter-finals and those of the semi-finals.

*AS Gabès withdrew on 1 August, and AS Kasserine on 3 August

Quarter-finals

Semi-finals

Final

See also
2014–15 Tunisian Ligue Professionnelle 1
2014–15 Tunisian Ligue Professionnelle 2

References

External links
 Coupe de Tunisie 2014-15
 Kawarji-Coupe de Tunisie
 Second Round results 

Tunisian Cup
Cup
Tunisia